Vlkaneč is a municipality and village in Kutná Hora District in the Central Bohemian Region of the Czech Republic. It has about 600 inhabitants.

Administrative parts
Villages of Kozohlody and Přibyslavice are administrative parts of Vlkaneč.

Transport
In Vlkaneč, there is a train station on the main railroad line Kolín – Havlíčkův Brod.

References

Villages in Kutná Hora District